Renu Desai is an Indian actress, costume designer, and former model.

Personal life
Renu Desai's mother tongue is Marathi, but she is also fluent in Telugu. She has a son, born in 2004 with Telugu actor Pawan Kalyan, whom she married on 28 January 2009. The couple also has a daughter born in 2010. They filed for divorce 2011, which was finalised in 2012. In 2018, Desai announced that she was engaged, but didn't reveal her fiancé's identity.

Career
Before her entry into Telugu films, Desai was a model and appeared in the music video of Shankar Mahadevan's song "Breathless".

She starred with her future husband in the films Badri and Johnny. Renu returned to her hometown and is active in Marathi films now. In 2013, she turned producer with Mangalashtak Once More and turned director with Ishq Wala Love in 2014.

Filmography

As actress

Television

As director

As costume designer

As editor

As producer

References

External links
 

Indian costume designers
Actresses in Telugu cinema
Living people
21st-century Indian actresses
Indian film actresses
Actresses from Pune
21st-century Indian designers
Gujarati people
Year of birth missing (living people)